Dolichopus superbus is a species of long-legged fly in the family Dolichopodidae.

References

superbus
Articles created by Qbugbot
Insects described in 1921